Palmer Home is a historic home for the aged located at Dover, Kent County, Delaware. It was built in 1907, and is a -story, brick structure with a gable roof in the Colonial Revival style. A two-story, flat roofed wing was added in 1930.  The front facade features a hip roofed porch with Doric order columns and a square balustrade.  It was built by the woman's organization The King's Daughters, and remained in operation until 1987.

It was added to the National Register of Historic Places in 1988.

References

Buildings and structures on the National Register of Historic Places in Delaware
Colonial Revival architecture in Delaware
Buildings and structures completed in 1907
Buildings and structures in Dover, Delaware
National Register of Historic Places in Dover, Delaware